Concentration can refer to:

Science, engineering, and technology
 Concentration, in chemistry, the measure of how much of a given substance there is mixed with another substance
 Mass concentration (astronomy), a region of a planet or moon's crust that is denser than average
 Number density in physics, chemistry, and astronomy

Entertainment
 Concentration (card game), the card game
 Concentration (game show), American television game show
 Concentration (album), an album by Machines of Loving Grace
 Concentration 20, an album by Namie Amuro

Psychology
 Attentional control, the cognitive process of controlling the focus of attention

Religion
 Samadhi (Buddhism), mental concentration in Buddhism

Economics 
 Market concentration, in economics, the number and production share of firms in a market (or industry)
 Concentration ratio, in economics, a measure of market concentration.

Other uses 
 Concentration camp, a detention center created for specific groups of people, usually during wartime
 A term used at Brown University, Colgate University, Columbia University, Harvard College, and Saint Olaf College to refer to a type of academic major
 Force concentration, and concentrate, in military tactics, the practice of concentrating military units

See also
Concentrate (disambiguation)